Jonathan Portes (born 18 April 1966) is Professor of Economics and Public Policy at the School of Politics & Economics of King's College, London and a senior fellow at UK in a Changing Europe.

Early life and education
Portes is the son of Richard Portes, a Rhodes Scholar from Chicago in the United States. He earned a degree in mathematics from Balliol College, Oxford, and a master's degree in Public Affairs (Economics and Public Policy) at Princeton University.

Career
After joining HM Treasury in 1987, he held increasingly senior positions in the civil service, rising to be the chief economist at the Department for Work and Pensions and then the chief economist at the Cabinet Office under Gordon Brown. He left the civil service in 2011, after the Labour Party lost power to the Conservative-Liberal Democrat coalition government.

Portes was appointed as the director of the National Institute of Economic and Social Research in February 2011. In October 2015, it was announced that Portes would step down as Director of NIESR before the end of that year, following a management review at the organisation.

His areas of interest include fiscal policy, labour markets and immigration. He has a particular interest in the economic effects of Brexit, and was a prominent critic of the 'austerity' policies advocated by George Osborne, the former Chancellor of the Exchequer; Portes has described the Coalition's Incapacity Benefit reassessment programme — a major Whitehall project that was supposed to cut welfare spending by up to seven billion pounds a year — as "the biggest single social policy failure of the last fifteen years". He analysed the government's welfare reforms for BBC Radio 4 in 2014.

Portes is a council member of the Royal Economic Society, a trustee of the charity Coram, a senior fellow at the UK in a Changing Europe.

Views
Portes maintains UK government policy since 2010 has disproportionately harmed the poorest UK people.  Portes stated, "There were a lot of choices, and the government chose to balance the budget on the backs of the poorest."

References

External links
Staff page at NIESR
Jonathan Portes' Curriculum Vitae held at NIESR.
Guardian profile
London Review of Books profile
Independent profile
Commentary pieces written for the UK in a Changing Europe

1966 births
Living people
British Jews
Alumni of Balliol College, Oxford
Princeton University alumni
British economists
21st-century American economists
New Labour
Labour Party (UK) people